Miss Earth Venezuela 2017 was the 1st edition of Miss Earth Venezuela pageant held on August 20, 2017 at the Tamanaco Intercontinental Hotel in Caracas, Venezuela. At the end of the event, Ninoska Vásquez of Lara was crowned as the pageant's first winner. She represented Venezuela in Miss Earth 2017, making it to the Top 8 during the finals.

Final results

Special awards

Judges

Official contestants
26 contestants competed for the title.

Contestants notes 
 Ninoska Vásquez placed as Top 8 in Miss Earth 2017 in Manila, Philippines.
 María Daniela Velasco (Distrito Capital) placed as Top 10 in Miss United Continents 2017 in Guayaquil, Ecuador and later became Miss Earth Venezuela 2021 and placed as Top 8 at Miss Earth 2021.
Isbel Parra (Trujillo) who is Miss Venezuela International 2020 and will compete in Miss International 2022 in Yokohama, Japan.

External links 
 Miss Earth Venezuela official account on Instagram

Miss Earth Venezuela
2017 in Venezuela
2017 beauty pageants